Somewhere in Georgia is a 1917 silent film, starring baseball great Ty Cobb. It was based on a short story by sports columnist Grantland Rice.

Plot
Cobb stars as a small-town Georgian bank clerk with a talent for baseball. When he's signed to play with the Detroit Tigers, Cobb is forced to leave his sweetheart (Elsie MacLeod) behind, whereupon a crooked bank cashier sets his sights on the girl. Upon learning that Cobb has briefly returned home to play an exhibition game with his old team, the cashier arranges for Cobb to be kidnapped. Breaking loose from his bonds, Cobb beats up all of his captors and shows up at the ball field just in time to win the game for the home team.

Cobb's salary 
Cobb starred in the motion picture Somewhere in Georgia for a sum of $25,000 plus expenses (equivalent to approximately $ today).

Reception 
Broadway critic Ward Morehouse called the movie "absolutely the worst flicker I ever saw, pure hokum."

Cast (in credits order)
Ty Cobb	... 	Himself – Ty Cobb
Elsie MacLeod	... 	The Banker's Daughter
William Corbett (as Will Corbett)
Harry Fisher		
Edward Boulden	(as Eddie Boulden)
Ned Burton

Survival status 
No prints of this film are known to survive.

References

External links 
 

1917 films
Lost sports drama films
1917 short films
1910s sports drama films
American black-and-white films
American silent short films
American baseball films
American sports drama films
Ty Cobb
1917 lost films
Lost American films
Films with screenplays by Lillian Case Russell
1917 drama films
1910s American films
Silent American drama films

Silent sports drama films